FTK may refer to:
 Forensic Toolkit, digital forensics software
 For the Kids (disambiguation)
 "Fuck the Kells", a song by American punk rock band Tijuana Sweetheart
 First Turn Kill (Trading Card Game)
 Godman Army Airfield, at Fort Knox, Kentucky, United States